The Poot family is a family that was admitted to the bourgeoisie of Brussels and from 1753 was registered among the Seven Noble Houses of Brussels.

The seven noble houses of Brussels 
The Seven Noble Houses of Brussels were the seven families of Brussels whose descendants formed the patrician class of that city, and to whom special privileges in the government of that city were granted until the end of the Ancien Régime.

The house from which the family descend :
House of Sweerts

Heraldry

Bibliography 

 Jean-François Houtart, OGHB, Anciennes familles de Belgique, 2008, p. 397
François met den Ancxt, Poot Baudier, in Recueil nobiliaire belge, volume I, 1911, p. 151.

Authority 
Content in this edit is translated from the existing French Wikipedia article at :fr:Famille Poot; see its history for attribution.

References 

Belgian families
Ancient families
Seven Noble Houses of Brussels
House of Sweerts